Sun Zhuoming (born August 11, 1995) is a Chinese ice dancer and ice dancing coach.  He began competing with Chen Hong in the 2018–19 season. Together, they are the 2019 Chinese national silver medalists.

With his former skating partner, Song Linshu, he is the 2018 Chinese national silver medalist. They competed twice at the Four Continents Championships and at 2016 Cup of China. He also competed with Cong Yue at the national level earlier in his career.

Programs

With Chen

With Song

With Cong

Competitive highlights
GP: Grand Prix; CS: Challenger Series

With Chen

With Song

With Cong

Coaching era
As at the 2022-23 figure skating season, Sun Zhuoming currently coaches the following ice dance teams:
  Xiao Zixi / Wang Yi

References

External links 
 
 

1995 births
Living people
Chinese male ice dancers
Figure skaters from Changchun